Ohisa Creek is a river in Herkimer County in the state of New York. The creek begins southeast of Paines Hollow and flows southeast then curves north and eventually converges with Nowadaga Creek in Newville.

References 

Rivers of Herkimer County, New York